Geovane de Jesus Rocha (born 31 July 2001) is a Brazilian footballer who plays for MLS side FC Dallas as a defender.

Career

Debut for Cruzeiro
From Riacho de Santana, Bahia he played in the youth teams of Palmeiras before joining Cruzeiro in 2020. On 25 April 2021 he made his professional debut for Cruzeiro in the Campeonato Mineiro against Clube Atlético Patrocinense. In March 2022 Jesus signed a new contract with Cruzeiro taking him to 2025 with the club. Jesus made his Campeonato Brasileiro Série B league debut on 27 April
2022 in a 1–0 win for Cruzeiro against Londrina Esporte Clube. Just a few days later he scored his first league goal on 30 April 2022 against Chapecoense.

Serie B title
Jesus played 27 times in the league and 40 times across all competitions as Cruzeiro won the Brazilian Série B title and gained promotion to Série A during the 2022 season. He was predominantly used at right-back. He scored in what would become his final match for Cruzeiro on 6 November 2022 as Cruzeiro won 3–2 against CSA to crown their promotion and relegate their opponents.

FC Dallas
In December 2022 it was confirmed the player would take an international roster slot for FC Dallas of MLS, signing a contract through 2026 with an option for a further year. He made his MLS debut on February 26, 2023 against Minnesota United FC.

Honours

Club
Cruzeiro
Série B:  2022
Campeonato Mineiro 2022 Runner-up

References

External links

Living people
2001 births
Brazilian footballers
Association football defenders
Campeonato Brasileiro Série B players
Cruzeiro Esporte Clube players
Sportspeople from Bahia
FC Dallas players